Kevin Lee Cooper (born 8 February 1975) is an English football manager and former professional footballer.

Playing career
Cooper began his career as a trainee at his hometown club Derby County but managed only five first team appearances for the club in total. His league debut came on 7 May 1995, as a substitute in a 2–1 defeat at Watford. In the spring of 1997, he found an opportunity for first team football when he was taken on loan at First Division Stockport County.

The midfielder joined the Edgeley Park club permanently that summer for £150,000 and went on to make 173 appearances in total over almost four seasons. He eventually moved to Wimbledon in March 2001 for £800,000. He stayed a year with the Dons, notching his best seasonal goal tally of 10 during the 2001-02 season. (Cooper is not to be confused with striker Kevin Cooper, who scored 90 goals for AFC Wimbledon from 2002-4 and was their highest scorer over two seasons). However, he ended the season by being signed by his former Stockport manager Dave Jones, now at Wolverhampton Wanderers, for £1 million in March 2002. His commitment and skill playing for Wimbledon FC won him the fans' player of the year award, which he was presented with on the pitch at Molineux playing for his new team.

He joined Wolves primarily to replace the then-injured Mark Kennedy, and played the remainder of the 2001-02 season as Wolves, who had been challenging for automatic promotion for most of the season, finished in the play-offs. Wolves eventually lost to Norwich City, despite Cooper scoring a spectacular long range goal in the second leg. He then featured regularly, although not as a first choice player, throughout the following season as the team won promotion to the Premier League.

Cooper did not get to enjoy the top flight though. His one substitute appearance against Charlton Athletic was the only Premier League appearance of his career. He spent the later half of the season on loan at second-tier clubs Sunderland and Norwich City, where he won a championship medal as the Canaries won the division.

He returned to Wolves, post-relegation, and found himself back in the side during the 2004-05 season. However, he requested a transfer for more playing time, and was signed again by Dave Jones, newly appointed at fellow Championship club Cardiff City, in July 2005. He was a regular player in his first season at Ninian Park but fell out of favour in the following years and was loaned out to Yeovil Town and Walsall during the 2006-07 season and was subsequently placed on the transfer list at the end of the season.

He stayed at Cardiff through the summer but again found himself only in the reserve squad at the start of the year, so he joined League One side Tranmere Rovers on a one-month loan in October 2007. After returning to his parent club, he was given a send-off game against Welshpool Town in the FAW Premier Cup, his first game in over a year for the Bluebirds.

His contract at Cardiff was terminated by mutual consent on 1 February 2008, so that Cooper would have a better chance of finding a new side. One week later, he joined Chesterfield until the end of the season. where he made a goalscoring debut against Grimsby, However, his contract was not extended at the end of the season and he was released.

He signed with Conference South team Newport County on 15 July 2008. He was released in October 2009.

Cooper then played for Neath in the Welsh Premier League, playing 33 league games for the club, and also appeared for the University of Glamorgan football team. He scored a candidate for goal of the season in late 2010 as he chipped Newtown goalkeeper Dave Roberts from the halfway line at Latham Park.

Managerial career
After leaving Neath, Cooper relocated to Malaysia to manage Cardiff's 1MCC – One Malaysia Cardiff City – which is linked to the Far Eastern ownership of Cardiff City he played for KLI in the KLEV League.

Ahead of the start of the 2012–13 season, Cooper returned to Cardiff City as the coach of the club's under-21 side.

In 2014 Kevin Cooper was appointed as the manager of Swiss second-tier side Servette Geneva. Although he guided the team to second place in the Swiss Challenge League, the team was relegated to the third tier of Swiss football for 2015-16 for financial reasons.

On 4 November 2015, fellow Challenge League side FC Wil announced that they signed Cooper on a contract that would keep him at the club until 2017.

On 18 January 2017, was appointed as Assistant Manager at Hartlepool United.

On 24 April 2017, was sacked as Assistant Manager at Hartlepool United.

2019, come to Malaysia and appointed as Head Coach at ATM FA, M3 team.

Personal life
Kevin Cooper is the father of the Welsh footballer Oli Cooper.

Honours
Norwich City
 Football League First Division: 2003–04

References

External links

Career information at ex-canaries.co.uk

1975 births
Living people
Footballers from Derby
English footballers
Premier League players
English Football League players
Association football midfielders
Wimbledon F.C. players
Cardiff City F.C. players
Norwich City F.C. players
Sunderland A.F.C. players
Wolverhampton Wanderers F.C. players
Stockport County F.C. players
Derby County F.C. players
Yeovil Town F.C. players
Tranmere Rovers F.C. players
Chesterfield F.C. players
Newport County A.F.C. players
Neath F.C. players
Cymru Premier players
Hartlepool United F.C. non-playing staff